Serkan Erdoğan (born 30 August 1978) is a retired Turkish professional basketball player. Erdoğan tested positive for the banned substance Nandrolone, and was thus immediately suspended from the FIBA SuproLeague's 2000–01 season competition.

Professional career
Erdoğan was a developmental product of the TED Ankara Kolejliler academy, and made his professional debut with that team. He then played with the Turkish Super League clubs Tuborg Pilsener, Tofaş, and Ülkerspor. After that, Erdoğan played with TAU Ceramica of the Spanish League. 

Erdoğan then played with the Turkish clubs Efes Pilsen and Türk Telekom. After that he moved to the Spanish club Meridiano Alicante. On January 24, 2011, he signed a contract with the Turkish club Beşiktaş. He signed a two-year contract with the Turkish club Banvit, in the summer of 2011. He signed a contract with the Turkish club Royal Halı Gaziantep, in the summer of 2013. With Gaziantep, he played his last game in professional club basketball in December 2013.

FIBA SuproLeague ban
Erdoğan tested positive for the banned substance Nandrolone, and he was thus immediately suspended from the FIBA SuproLeague's 2000–01 season competition. Erdoğan tested positive in his "A" urine sample, which revealed a level of Nandrolone (anabolic androgenic steroids) that was above the limit specified under FIBA's doping controls. The positive test result, which was tested by the body that is responsible for FIBA's drug testing, came after Ulker's home game against Panathinaikos Athens, on 7 December 2000.

National team career
Erdoğan was also a member of the senior Turkish national team.

References

External links 
FIBA Profile
FIBA Europe Profile
Euroleague.net Profile
Spanish League Archive Profile
TBLStat.net Profile

1978 births
Living people
2006 FIBA World Championship players
Anadolu Efes S.K. players
Bandırma B.İ.K. players
Basketbol Süper Ligi head coaches
Beşiktaş men's basketball players
CB Lucentum Alicante players
Doping cases in basketball
Gaziantep Basketbol players
Liga ACB players
People from Amasya
Saski Baskonia players
Shooting guards
TED Ankara Kolejliler players
Tofaş S.K. players
Tuborg Pilsener basketball players
Turkish basketball coaches
Turkish expatriate basketball people in Spain
Turkish men's basketball players
Turkish sportspeople in doping cases
Türk Telekom B.K. players
Ülker G.S.K. basketball players